Hee Haw is an American television variety show.

Hee Haw may also refer to:
 the sound of a donkey
 Hee Haw (EP), EP by The Birthday Party
 Hee Haw (album), album by The Birthday Party
 Heee Haw, citrus soda

See also 
 Bray (disambiguation)